Pablo Sicilia Roig (born 10 September 1981) is a Spanish former footballer who played usually as a central defender.

He spent most of his 11-year professional career with Tenerife, appearing in 197 competitive games over six seasons, one spent in La Liga.

Club career
Sicilia was born in Las Palmas, Canary Islands. After starting professionally with local UD Vecindario, he joined Atlético Madrid for the 2004–05 season, but was mainly registered with the reserves. On 19 February 2006 he made his sole appearance with the first team, playing one minute in a 3–0 away win against neighbours Getafe CF.

In the 2006–07 campaign, Sicilia signed for CD Tenerife in the second division, being an early first choice. In his third year, he contributed 36 games (2,843 minutes) as the club returned to La Liga after a seven-year absence.

From 2009 to 2012, Sicilia played a further 80 league matches and scored eight goals, but Tenerife suffered two consecutive relegations in the process. He retired subsequently, aged 30.

References

External links

1981 births
Living people
Footballers from Las Palmas
Spanish footballers
Association football defenders
La Liga players
Segunda División players
Segunda División B players
Tercera División players
UD Las Palmas Atlético players
Universidad de Las Palmas CF footballers
UD Vecindario players
Atlético Madrid B players
Atlético Madrid footballers
CD Tenerife players